Olesya Vladimirovna Belugina  (born January 2, 1984) is a Russian gymnast and Olympic champion. She is a two-time (2003, 2005) World Group All-around champion and a two-time (2003, 2006) European Group All-around champion.

Career
She competed at the 2004 Summer Olympics in Athens where she received a gold medal in the rhythmic group competition.

Detailed Olympic results

References

External links

1984 births
Living people
Russian rhythmic gymnasts
Gymnasts at the 2004 Summer Olympics
Olympic gymnasts of Russia
Olympic gold medalists for Russia
Sportspeople from Penza
Penza State University alumni
Olympic medalists in gymnastics
Medalists at the 2004 Summer Olympics
Medalists at the Rhythmic Gymnastics World Championships
Medalists at the Rhythmic Gymnastics European Championships
21st-century Russian women